Globularia salicina is a shrub native to the archipelago of Madeira and to the central and western Canary Islands.

Description
Erect shrub up to 2 m high with slender branches. Leaves 3.5-7 x 0.5–3 cm, alternate, narrowly to broadly lanceolate, entire, glabrous, acute, attenuate at the base, erect to erectopatent, evergreen. Inflorescences in dense globular heads with tomentose to glabrescent ovate axillary bracts, with densely long ciliate margins. Heads often less than 1.5 cm across, often crowded towards the tips of the stems, pale powder blue or whitish, hermaphrodite and zygomorphic. Calyx tubular, deeply 5-lobed, lobes linear, margins ciliate. Corolla 4 mm long with a slender tube, 2-lipped, the upper lip almost absent, the lower with 3 long lobes. Stamens exserted 4, style exserted, stigma bilobed. Fruit a small 1-seeded nut 1 mm, dark brown.

Distribution
Common in Madeira on hillsides, cliffs, slopes, among rocks, and rough grassland. Found mostly below 300 m, seldom above 400 m in the north, but up to 700 m in the south. Rare in Porto Santo and also known from Deserta Grande.

Rare on Gran Canaria, but common on southern slopes in Tenerife and on northern coastal region of La Gomera. It is also found in El Hierro and in the north eastern region of La Palma.

Gallery

References

 Press, J. R. and M. J. Short. Flora of Madeira. Natural History Museum, UK. 1994. 
 David Bramwell and Zoë Bramwell. Wild Flowers of the Canary Islands. Editorial Rueda, Madrid, España. 2001. 

salicina
Flora of the Canary Islands
Flora of Madeira
Endemic flora of Macaronesia